C. J. Smith may refer to:

C. J. Smith (American football) (born 1993), American football cornerback
C. J. Smith (ice hockey) (born 1994), American ice hockey left winger
C. J. Smith (soccer) (born 1998), Canadian soccer player